Return Engagement may refer to:

Return Engagement, a 1978 episode  of the Hallmark Hall of Fame
Return Engagement (1983 film), a documentary film featuring Timothy Leary and G. Gordon Liddy
Return Engagement (1990 film), a Hong Kong action film
Return Engagement (play), a 1940 play by Lawrence Riley
Return Engagement (album), a 1988 album by The Country Gentlemen
"Return Engagement" - a jazz composition on Stanley Turrentine's debut album, Look Out!
Settling Accounts: Return Engagement, a novel by Harry Turtledove